Wang Zhi may refer to:
 Empress Wang Zhi (173 BC – 126 BC), Han Dynasty empress and the mother of Emperor Wu
 Wang Zhi (pirate), Ming Dynasty pirate
 Wang Zhi (actress), Chinese actress from Liaoning
 Wang Zhi (fictional), a character in Romance of the Three Kingdoms